Kathryn Joy Fagg  is a professional engineer, a board member and board chair from Australia.

Fagg has been a board member of the Reserve Bank of Australia since 2013, Boral president of Chief Executive Women, Chairman at Melbourne Recital Centre, and a director of Incitec Pivot, Breast Cancer Network of Australia and Djerriwarrh Investments. In 2013 she received the University of Queensland’s Inaugural Vice-Chancellor’s Alumni Excellence Award and was elected fellow of the Australian Academy of Technology and Engineering. Four years later she was awarded the Ada Lovelace Medal for Outstanding Woman Engineer (2017) where she was reported as being “an inspiration to us all, particularly young women.” Her professional career includes: (Esso Australia now known as) ExxonMobil from 1983-1989, consulting with McKinsey and Company, banking with ANZ, leadership roles at BlueScope Steeland Linfox (2009–11) President of FMCG (Fast Moving Consumer Goods), as well as its non-executive director.

Fagg was appointed an Officer of the Order of Australia (AO) in the 2019 Queen's Birthday Honours for "distinguished service to business and finance, to the central banking, logistics and manufacturing sectors, and to women".

References

Living people
Australian engineers
Australian business executives
Year of birth missing (living people)
Officers of the Order of Australia
Fellows of the Australian Academy of Technological Sciences and Engineering